Aprophata notha is a species of beetle in the family Cerambycidae. It was described by Newman in 1842, originally under the genus Abryna.  It is known from the Philippines.

References

Pteropliini
Beetles described in 1842